Juancho Evertsz (8 March 1923 in Curaçao – 30 April 2008 in Curaçao), whose full name was Juan Miguel Gregorio Evertsz, was a Dutch Antillean politician who served as the Prime Minister of the Netherlands Antilles between 1973 and 1977.

Evertsz was one of the founding members and leaders of the Antilles National People's Party, which is also known by the abbreviation, NVP. He openly opposed a plan to separate Aruba from the Netherlands Antilles as a separate, autonomous entity within the Kingdom of the Netherlands during his tenure as Prime Minister. Evertsz argued that the removal of Aruba from the Netherlands Antilles would undermine the federation of Dutch islands in the Caribbean. Aruba later seceded from the Netherlands Antilles in 1986, but remained within the Kingdom of the Netherlands.

Evertsz also openly clashed with Dutch Prime Minister Joop den Uyl and the Dutch Labour Party when the Uyl proposed full independence for the Netherlands Antilles. Evertsz vehemently opposed the proposal.

Juancho Evertsz died on Curaçao on 30 April 2008, at the age of 85, leaving behind his wife, two sons (Dennis and Kenneth) and one daughter (Sharline).

See also
List of prime ministers of the Netherlands Antilles

References

External links
Radio Netherlands: Juancho Evertsz dies (Papiamento)

1923 births
2008 deaths
Prime Ministers of the Netherlands Antilles
Curaçao politicians
20th century in Aruba
National People's Party (Curaçao) politicians